The Pont Jacques Chaban-Delmas is a vertical-lift bridge over the Garonne in Bordeaux, France. It was inaugurated on 16 March 2013 by President François Hollande and Alain Juppé, mayor of Bordeaux. Its main span is 110 m (361 ft) long. As of 2013, it is the longest vertical-lift bridge in Europe.  It is named in honour of Jacques Chaban-Delmas, a former Prime Minister of France and a former mayor of Bordeaux.

References

External links

Bridges in France
Bridges over the Garonne
Vertical lift bridges
Pont Jacques Chaban-Delmas
Pont Jacques Chaban-Delmas
Bridges completed in 2012
21st-century architecture in France